Crazy and the Brains (stylized as "Crazy & the Brains") is an American punk band. The band was originally a Christoph Jesus and Jeff Rubin project that frequented The Sidewalk Cafe in New York, New York starting around 2013.

The band was formally created in Bayonne, New Jersey and hails that as its home. Current members are from Bayonne NJ, Jersey City NJ, Brooklynn NY, and Boston MA.

Members
Crazy & The Brains currently consists of lead singer Christoph Jesus, guitarist Ernest Young, bassist Rob Mellinger, drummer Zac Pless, and Ali Presses on keys.

Former members include Jeff Rubin (xylophone), Brett Miller (bass), and Lawrence Miller (drums).

History

They have toured with Gogol Bordello, The Bouncing Souls, The Bridge City Sinners, Days N Daze, Negative Approach, The Slackers, and Leftover Crack.

Vice has compared them to Rancid and The Ramones. Earlier press also made mention of their use of xylophone in songs, referring to them as "xylo-punks" and noting "[t]here aren’t a whole lot of punk bands that feature the xylophone".

Discography

Studio albums
Let Me Go (2013)  
Good Lord (2014)  
Into the Ugly (2018)

EPs, splits and compilations
Out in the Weedz (2011) EP  
Where the Juice Drips (2020) EP

Singles
All I Really Want (2014) 
Brain Freeze (2015)  
Punk Rocker (2021) 
East Side (2021) 
Open Eyes (2021) 
Tractor Beam remix with Mega Ran produced by K-Murdock of Panacea (2022)

Videos (aka The Holographic Universe)

Crazy & The Brains - East Side [Official Music Video] was released March 11, 2022. It was Directed by Jak Kerley, Produced by Crazy & the Brains and Make Up was done by Ari Shah Conkright.

References

External links

Official Bandcamp page
Official Website

Musical groups established in 2013